Arch Rock may refer to:

in Australia
 Arch Rock (Tasmania), Australia

in the United States
 Arch Rock (Mackinac Island), Michigan
 Three Arch Rocks National Wildlife Refuge, Oregon
 Arch Rock, part of Point Reyes National Seashore in California
 Arch Rock off Anacapa Island in California

See also
 Natural arch
 Arches National Park